Princess Ayah bint Faisal of Jordan (born 11 February 1990) is the daughter of Prince Faisal bin Hussein and Princess Alia and is a niece of King Abdullah II of Jordan. She is the eldest of Prince Faisal's children.
She is President of the Jordanian Volleyball Federation, as well as a board member at the Jordan Olympic Committee (JOC).

Princess Ayah was married on 22 May 2014 in Amman, Jordan, to Mohammed Talal al Halawani in the presence of King Abdullah II, Queen Rania, Crown Prince Hussein, Princess Muna, Princess Alia, Princess Iman, Prince Talal, Prince Ali, Queen Sofía of Spain, and other royals and dignitaries. On 2 May 2016, she gave birth to her first child, a daughter named Raiyah.

On 19 October 2019, she gave birth to her second child, a daughter named Nasmah.

On March 12th 2022 she gave birth to her third child, a son named Hussein.

Marriage and children
Princess Ayah was married on 22 May 2014 in Amman, Jordan, to Mohammad Talal Halawani in the presence of King Abdullah II, Queen Rania, Crown Prince Hussein, Princess Muna, Princess Alia, Princess Iman, Prince Talal, Prince Ali, Queen Sofía of Spain, and other royals and dignitaries. 

They have three children together:

 Raiyah al Halawani  (born 2 May 2016).
 Nasmah al Halawani (born 19 October 2019).
 Hussein al Halawani (born 12 March 2022).

Ancestry

References

Living people
1990 births
Jordanian princesses
House of Hashim
Jordanian people of English descent